"Don't Want to Be a Fool" is a song by American recording artist Luther Vandross, released in June 1991 as the second single from his seventh album, Power of Love (1991). The song peaked at No. 4 on the US Billboard R&B Singles chart on September 14. It also peaked at No. 9 on the Billboard Hot 100 on November 2 same year.

Critical reception
Stephen Thomas Erlewine from AllMusic named the song one of the "high points" of the album. Larry Flick from Billboard wrote, "Second single from Vandross' current Power of Love disc places the acclaimed vocalist in a familiar R&B ballad setting. Lovely tune has already begun making radio and chart inroads, and should have no trouble matching the success of its predecessor." Henderson and DeVaney from Cashbox described it as "a smooth, mid-tempo "up-town soul" song oozing with emotion."

Track listing
 US cassette single, CD single
"Don't Want to Be a Fool" — 4:35

Charts

References

1991 singles
Luther Vandross songs
Songs written by Luther Vandross
1991 songs
Pop ballads
Contemporary R&B ballads
Songs written by Marcus Miller
Epic Records singles
Soul ballads